The 2007 Turkish Super Cup was a football match between the Turkish Super League Champion, Fenerbahçe S.K., and the Turkish Cup winner, Beşiktaş J.K. Fenerbahçe won 2-1.

Match details

External links
http://www.tff.org/Default.aspx?pageID=29&macId=67630

2007
Super Cup
Turkish Super Cup 2007
Turkish Super Cup 2007
2007